The surname or the name Joeckel, also written Jöckel, Jockel or Jokel, of German origin, may refer to:

Carleton B. Joeckel (1886–1960), scholar
Gordon Jockel (1920–2015), Australian diplomat
Heinrich Jöckel (1898–1946), German war criminal, SS-Hauptsturmführer
Hermann Jöckel (1920–1991), German football player
Luke Joeckel (born 1991), American football player
Samuel Joeckel, American author and professor of english

See also 
A German pet form for the given name Jakob, a cognate of Jacob and James in English